Very PERSONal is an album by saxophonist Houston Person recorded in 1980 and released on the Muse label early the following year.

Reception

Allmusic reviewer Ron Wynn noted the album was "A departure for tenor saxophonist Houston Person, normally a soul jazz, blues, funk, and ballads player. This is more mainstream jazz and hard bop ... All those who felt that Person couldn't play bop changes were left looking silly when this came out in 1980".

Track listing 
 "Daydream" (Billy Strayhorn, Duke Ellington, John La Touche) − 4:13 
 "Peace" (Horace Silver) − 5:31 
 "Chicago Serenade" (Eddie Harris) − 6:19
 "Steppin' into Beauty" (Rahsaan Roland Kirk) − 4:32
 "I'll Let You Know" (Cedar Walton) − 6:20
 "Berkshire Blues" (Randy Weston) − 7:36
 "God Bless the Child" (Billie Holiday, Arthur Herzog, Jr.) − 6:21

Personnel 
Houston Person − tenor saxophone 
Curtis Fuller − trombone
Cedar Walton − piano
Buster Williams − bass
Vernel Fournier − drums

References 

Houston Person albums
1980 albums
Muse Records albums
Albums recorded at Van Gelder Studio